Junia may refer to:

Three daughters of Servilia, mistress of Caesar, sisters or half sisters of Marcus Junius Brutus
Junia Prima
Junia Secunda
Junia Tertia
Junia Calvina, Roman noblewoman of 1st century
Junia Lepida, another Roman noblewoman of 1st century
Junia Claudilla, first wife of Caligula
Junia (New Testament person), or Junias, a person mentioned by Paul in the Epistle to the Romans
Junia (gens), a Roman gens
Lex Junia Licinia, a Roman law from 62 BC
Juniyan (Junia), a village in Pakistan
Júnia Ferreira Furtado, Portuguese historian